Diego Bermúdez may refer to:
Diego Bermúdez (singer) (1850–1923), Spanish flamenco singer
Diego Bermúdez (footballer) (born 1982), Spanish footballer